George Edmondson (1798–1863) was an English educationalist.

Life
Edmondson, born in Lancaster, Lancashire 8 September 1798 of Quaker parents, spent his early years entirely among Quakers, and always belonged to the Society of Friends. He shared a gift for mechanical invention with his brother Thomas. They were both educated at Ackworth School, Yorkshire, of which John Fothergill was the principal supporter. At age of 14 Edmondson left; he wished to be a teacher, and was apprenticed to William Singleton, the reading master of Ackworth School, who had set up a boarding-school in a large house at Broomhall, near Sheffield. There Edmondson learned bookbinding, and Daniel Wheeler taught him agriculture.

In 1814 Alexander I of Russia visited England. He was impressed by the Quakers, and in 1817 invited Wheeler to superintend some agricultural institutions in Russia. Edmondson, on the suggestion of Singleton, joined the party as tutor to Wheeler's children and assistant in the work. He lived in Russia until 1820, when he returned to England to marry Anne Singleton, daughter of the schoolmaster. He returned with his wife to Okhta, near St. Petersburg, where they were living during the flooding in 1824. In the course of the following year the whole of the bog land around the capital was brought into cultivation.

After seven years' residence in Russia, Edmondson returned to England, although the emperor made him handsome offers to remain. He returned to England less rich than he might have been but for his scruples against accepting bribes. The tsar offered Edmondson a thousand acres of unreclaimed land at Shushary, which Edmondson declined. In England Edmondson opened a school at Blackburn in 1830, and a little later on one at Tulketh Hall, near Preston. Successful at Tulketh, he was asked to take on Queenwood Hall near Stockbridge, Hampshire, erected by the followers of Robert Owen, with 800 acres of land. In 1847 he set up a science and technical school teaching agriculture. He was one of the early promoters of the College of Preceptors, and vocational training, with a carpenter's and a blacksmith's shop. There was a printing-office, in which a monthly periodical was issued, edited, and at one time set up by the boys. He had several Bradshaws among his school books, in which the boys were examined in finding routes. John Tyndall, Thomas Archer Hirst, Heinrich Debus, and Edward Frankland were among the teachers. One of the first pupils at Queenwood was Henry Fawcett.

Edmondson died, after one day's illness, 15 May 1863, and was buried in the burial-ground of the Society of Friends at Southampton.

References

1798 births
1863 deaths
Schoolteachers from Lancashire
19th-century English educators
English expatriates in Russia
English Quakers
19th-century Quakers
Founders of English schools and colleges
19th-century British philanthropists